John Mudgeway was a New Zealand rugby union and rugby league footballer who represented South Africa at the 1995 Rugby League World Cup.

Playing career
Born in Masterton, Mudgeway attended school in New Zealand, being an active rower and in the school's rugby union first XV. He went on to play representative rugby union in New Zealand and club rugby in Wales for the Swansea RFC. Mudgeway played 51 games for Swansea between 1986–87 and 1990–91. He then moved to Durban in South Africa.

Later years
He was diagnosed with motor neurone disease in 2002.

A friend of Sharks coach John Plumtree, Mudgeway died the day before the 2010 Currie Cup final. The Sharks won the Currie Cup the next day, defeating Western Province 30–10.

References

1960s births
2010 deaths
Deaths from motor neuron disease
Neurological disease deaths in South Africa
New Zealand emigrants to South Africa
New Zealand rugby union players
Rugby league locks
Rugby league players from Masterton
Rugby union centres
Rugby union wings
South Africa national rugby league team players
South African rugby league players
Swansea RFC players